Toller Porcorum is a village and civil parish in Dorset, England, situated in the Toller valley  northwest of Dorchester. In the 2011 census the civil parish—which also includes the small settlements of Higher and Lower Kingcombe to the north—had a population of 307.

Population 
A rural and slowly growing area with a population of 307  Toller Porcorum is a village of approximately 160 households

History 
Like the other Toller villages of Toller Fratrum and Toller Whelme, the name was taken from the river, which is now known as the Hooke. The addition Porcorum means of the pigs in Latin; the village was in the past sometimes known as Swines Toller, but more often as Great Toller.

Toller Porcorum is also an ancient Anglican ecclesiastical parish. The church is dedicated to Saints Peter and Andrew and is remarkable for the "drooping chancel".

From 1862 to 1975 the village had a railway station on the Bridport Railway.

The Old Swan 
The village pub, The Old Swan, was closed by the brewery in 1999 and has since been converted into a private dwelling.  Skittles was played there.

The village hall 
The village has an active village hall, with its own website, which prior to Covid-19 hosted a range of events. https://tollervillagehall.co.uk//

Notable people 
Despite its small size the village has been home to a number of notable people. George of Clarence (famous for having been mysteriously drowned in a butt of Malmsey wine) was at one point the owner of the majority of the village.

References

External links

 Dorset Historic Churches Trust, with pictures
 A site about Toller Porcorum, with pictures

Villages in Dorset